

Events
The Chicago Crime Commission releases its first published report of those "who are constantly in conflict with the law" naming over 28 underworld figures as public enemies including James "Mad Bomber" Belcastro, Edward O'Donnell, James "Fur" Sammons, William "Three Fingers" White, Jake Guzik, and Al Capone.
Al Capone, assisted by longtime Cook County racketeer Edward Vogel, establishes his headquarters in the Chicago suburb of Cicero, Illinois.  
Owney Madden is released from Sing Sing prison. 
Ragen's Colts member Harry Madigan is arrested and charged with kidnapping and extortion. 
Joseph Lanza, member of the Masseria crime family (evolves later to Luciano, then Genovese crime family) organizes the United Seafood Workers (USW) of New York City's Fulton Fish Market. 
January 3 – William J. "Wild Bill" Lovett, leader of the New York City White Hand Gang, is shot twice in the chest by in a Brooklyn shanty. Although he eventually recovers from his wounds, he refuses to identify his attackers. 
August – The third New York City Labor slugger war (thugs hired by both sides to do battle in strikebreaker situations) begin after Jacob "Little Augie" Orgen's Little Augies and Solomon Schapiro ally against Nathan "Kid Dropper" Kaplan's Rough Riders during a gun battle between the gangs on Essex Street resulting in the deaths of two bystanders. 
August 28 – "Kid Dropper" Kaplan is killed by Little Augies' gunman Louis Cohen while being transported from Essex Market Court. 
September 7 – In a continuing bootlegger war in South Side, Chicago, between the Southside O'Donnell Brothers and an alliance of the Saltis-McErlane Gang and the Chicago Outfit, Saltis-McErlane leader Frank McErlane kills Jerry O'Connor, a member of the Southside O'Donnell Brothers, in a driveby shooting. McErlane is the first to use a Thompson submachine gun, which becomes popularly known as a "Tommy Gun". 
September 17 – "Tommy Gun" innovator Frank McErlane kills again, gunning down George Meegan and George Bucher of the Southside O'Donnell Brothers. 
November 1 – Having survived the January 3 assassination attempt, White Hand Gang leader "Wild Bill" Lovett is killed by three Black Hand assassins led by Dui Cuteddi. 
December 1 – Frank McErlane strikes again, killing Thomas Keane, a beer-runner for the Southside O'Donnell Brothers.

Arts and literature
When the Kellys Were Out (film)
 Season 3 of HBO's Boardwalk Empire

Births
Benjamin "Lefty" Ruggiero, Bonanno crime family member 
Joseph Todaro, Buffalo Mafia Leader
Gaetano Badalamenti, Italian mobster

Deaths
May 2 – Emilio Picariello and Florence Lassandro hanged for killing police officer, the only woman to be hanged in Alberta
August 23 – Nathan Kaplan, New York Prohibition gangster 
November 1 – William J. "Wild Bill" Lovett, White Hand Gang leader 

Organized crime
Years in organized crime